Dennison is an unincorporated community in Wabash Township in the northeast corner of Clark County, Illinois, east of Illinois Route 1 and north of Interstate 70.

Geography 
Dennison is located at 39°27'39" North, 87°35'52" West (39.4608688, -87.5978025).

References

External links
 Dennison History at Genealogy Trails.

Unincorporated communities in Clark County, Illinois
Unincorporated communities in Illinois